The Dolgorae-class submarine (Hangul: 돌고래급 잠수정) was a type of midget submarine designed and acquired for the Republic of Korea Navy. All three units are now retired.

These midget submarines were the first South Korean submarines of any type. They were acquired primarily to obtain initial experience with the basics of operating a submarine force. The secondary mission to train surface ASW ships in the detection of North Korean midget submarines.

Replacement
In November 2011, South Korea unveiled plans for a new mini-sub designated KSS-500A.

Ships in the class 

In November 2017, SSM-051 was opened as a museum ship in the new Seoul Battleship Park beside the Han River in western Seoul.

References
The information in this article is based on that in its Korean equivalent.

Midget submarines
Submarines of the Republic of Korea Navy
Ships built by Hanjin Heavy Industries
Submarine classes